National Hsin-Feng Senior High School is a coed public senior high school located in Gueiren District, Tainan, Taiwan. It is well known for its men's football team.

History 
National Hsin-Feng Senior High School was founded as two-year Gueiren Agriculture School on 27 March 1929 in order to cultivate local young people to professionals on agriculture. It was later renamed to Gueiren Rural Youth School in 1935, Hsin-Feng Youth School in 1936, Hsin-Feng Secondary School in 1939, and eventually changed to three-year Hsin-Feng Vocational Agriculture School. Before Taiwan was returned from Japan to the Republic of China in 1945, the title of school was changed five times and there had been four principals.

After the restitution of Taiwan in 1945, the school was renamed to Tainan County Hsin-Feng Primary Agriculture School, with Yu Shi-ling as the first principal. In August 1952, Huang Wei-ye succeeded Mr. Yu to become the school's principal. He started to enroll female students and increased the class number to 8. New classrooms, laboratory and library were constructed one after another. In August 1956, the school was transformed to the five-year Tainan County Hsin-Feng Agriculture Vocational High School. Foreign aid from the United States came in and helped to construct school buildings and to improve teaching facilities. In 1963, the Department of Domestic Affairs was set up.

On August 1, 1968, the government decided to extend compulsory education to 9 years. Therefore, the school was transformed to a comprehensive high school with both ordinary and vocational departments and renamed to Taiwan Provincial Hsin-Feng Senior High School. The school stopped taking in vocational students in 1972. Since then, it concentrated on ordinary high school education and tried to balance the difference between urban and rural education.

Nevertheless, in 1996, the school was transformed to comprehensive high school and enroll vocational students again, offering more choices for students. Now National Hsin-Feng Senior High School has about 1200 students and the school campus occupies 8 hectares.

Football team 

National Hsin-Feng Senior High School football team has been established for about 40 years and is one of the most competitive senior high school teams in southern Taiwan.

On April 28, 2008, Hsin-Feng alumnus Lin Chia-sheng exposed in his blog the school's decision of stopping the football team. The principal Wang Jung-fa stated that the football team members sometimes caused trouble and did not help with the school's college entrance rate.

Notable alumni

Football 
 Yeh Hsien-chung
 Lin Chia-sheng

Principals 
 Yu Shi-ling (余石陵), 1945–1952
 Huang Wei-ye (黃為業), 1952–1965
 Xu Yi-ming (許溢明), 1965–1982
 Guo Ruo-yu (郭若愚), 1982–1991
 He Ming-tang (何明堂), 1991–1993
 Wang Zeng-zhu (王增築), 1993–2001
 Wang Jung-fa (王榮發), 2001–present

See also
 Education in Taiwan

References

External links 
National Hsin-Feng Senior High School official site

1929 establishments in Taiwan
Educational institutions established in 1929
High schools in Taiwan
Schools in Tainan
Taiwanese youth football teams